The year 1922 was marked, in science fiction, by the following events.

Births and deaths

Births 

 April 16: John Christopher, British writer (died 2012)
 May 24: Gokulananda Mahapatra, Indian writer (died 2013)
 May 30: Hal Clement, American writer (died 2003)
 September 19: Damon Knight, American writer (died 2002)
 November 11: Kurt Vonnegut, American writer (died 2007)
 Bob Leman, American writer (died 2006)

Deaths

Events

Awards 
The main science-fiction Awards known at the present time did not exist at this time.

Literary releases

Novels

Stories collections

Short stories

Comics

Audiovisual outputs

Movies 
 Dr. Mabuse the Gambler, by Fritz Lang.

See also 
 1922 in science
 1921 in science fiction
 1923 in science fiction

References

Science fiction by year

science-fiction